Aavere is a village in Anija Parish, Harju County, in northern Estonia. The population was 7 in 2019.

History 
Aavere was first mentioned in 1241 in the Liber Census Daniæ, during the reign of King Valdemar II of Denmark, as Hauaueeræ. In 1355, the village was recorded as belonging to the Pirsu (Pirsen) manor. In 1540, the village belonged to the Anija Manor. It was part of the historic . In 1923, the settlement was recorded with the present-day spelling.

Geography 
The village is located in northern Estonia, in western Harju County.

Demographics 
As of the 2011 census, there were 12 people. Of the total residents, 25.0% were under the age of 18; 58.3% were between the ages of 18 and 64; and 16.7% were 65 years of age or older. The gender makeup of the village was 41.7% male and 58.3% female.

Transportation 
The village is near the junction of Estonian national roads T12 and T13.

Points of interest 
 Three cup-marked stones (cult stones) in the vicinity from the Stone Age or Bronze Age are registered as archaeological monuments

References

Villages in Harju County